Charles Victor Albert Aubrey de Vere Beauclerk, 11th Duke of St Albans (26 March 1870 – 19 September 1934) was a British peer and soldier, known as Earl of Burford before 1898.

Beauclerk was the eldest son of the 10th Duke of St Albans and a godchild of Queen Victoria and Albert, Prince of Wales. He was educated at Eton and afterwards joined the 1st Regiment of Life Guards as a Second Lieutenant in 1893, becoming Captain of the South Nottinghamshire Yeomanry in 1898 and later serving with the 3rd Battalion of the Royal Scots Regiment.

Beauclerk inherited his father's titles in 1898 and died in 1934, aged 64. He was unmarried and childless and his titles passed to his half-brother, Osborne.

Beauclerk suffered from severe depression all his life, according to his half-brother Osborne or "Obby". Trustees looked after his affairs from 1898 until his death in 1934. He was confined under certificates at Ticehurst Asylum from January 1899 till his death.

References

1870 births
1934 deaths
111
People educated at Eton College
British Life Guards officers
South Nottinghamshire Hussars officers
Royal Scots officers
C
People from Ticehurst